Mollie Peck Falkenstein was a dancer who became a puppeteer known for her work with finger puppets.

Biography 
In 1906, Mollie Peck was born in England and moved to Canada when she was six years old where she began training in ballet. In 1922 she moved to Los Angeles and became a professional dancer performing in “Rio Rita” in 1927, before landing a job as a ballerina for Ziegfeld Follies. Falkenstein got involved with puppets when her daughter, Jan, was in elementary school and she made a set of puppets and a story to accompany the puppets. This grew over time as the group of children performed in puppet shows with Falkenstein performing as the Chiquita Puppeteers.

Falkenstein also performed a one-woman show with finger puppet ballerinas that would eventually become known as the “dancing ballet.” The ballet puppet dancers had molded legs attached to Falkenstein’s fingers and a head and arms controlled by strings. This technique was later called “Ballerette”.

Falkenstein also worked on puppetry for the community and founded a puppetry guild in Orange County in 1961. Then, in 1964, she was invited to serve as the General Secretary for Union Internationale de la Marionnette - International Puppetry Association (UNIMA). Mrs. Falkenstein attended UNIMA IX Munich 1966, as the USA delegate and then founded the American Chapter of Union Internationale de la Marionnette (UNIMA-USA) in 1966 and began editing the chapter’s magazine APROPOS. Falkenstein would also serve as vice president of UNIMA-USA from 1976-1980.

Falkenstein passed away in 1992 and, after her death, an exhibit including marionettes, shadow figures, and hand and rod puppets was held at the John Wayne Airport called “Puppets for Mollie” to honor Falkenstein.

Awards and honors 
In 1978 Falkenstein received the Trustee’s Award from the Puppeteers of America. UNIMA-USA presented her with a citation of excellence in 1983, and she was named an honorary member of UNIMA.

References

External links 
, Puppeteers of America, posted March 24, 2020

Further reading 

1906 births
1992 deaths
American puppeteers
Dancers from California
Ziegfeld girls
UNIMA